Paul Matthew Woolford (born 1 June 1977 in Auckland) is a field hockey player from New Zealand, who earned his first cap for the national team, nicknamed The Black Sticks, in 1999. He won a silver medal at the 2002 Commonwealth Games in Manchester.

International senior tournaments
 2000 – Sultan Azlan Shah Cup
 2000 – Olympic Qualifying Tournament
 2001 – World Cup Qualifier
 2002 – World Cup
 2002 – Commonwealth Games
 2003 – Sultan Azlan Shah Cup
 2003 – Champions Challenge
 2004 – Olympic Qualifying Tournament
 2004 – Summer Olympics
 2004 – Champions Trophy
 2005 – Sultan Azlan Shah Cup
 2006 – Commonwealth Games
 2006 – World Cup
 2007 – Champions Challenge
 2008 – Olympic Games

References
 New Zealand Hockey

External links
 

New Zealand male field hockey players
Olympic field hockey players of New Zealand
2002 Men's Hockey World Cup players
Field hockey players at the 2002 Commonwealth Games
Field hockey players at the 2004 Summer Olympics
2006 Men's Hockey World Cup players
Field hockey players at the 2006 Commonwealth Games
Field hockey players at the 2008 Summer Olympics
Field hockey players from Auckland
1977 births
Living people
Commonwealth Games silver medallists for New Zealand
Commonwealth Games medallists in field hockey
Medallists at the 2002 Commonwealth Games